Vincent Munier (born 14 April 1976) is a French wildlife photographer and documentary filmmaker. Among his most notable works are his photographs of arctic wolves and snow leopards. He co-directed a film about snow leopards, The Velvet Queen (2021), which received the César Award for Best Documentary Film.

Life and work
Vincent Munier was born on 14 April 1976 in Épinal in Vosges, northeastern France. He began to photograph animals in the Vosges forests and mountains at the age of twelve, aided by his father. He went on to become a professional wildlife photographer.

Munier prefers to create landscape photographs with animals that viewers might not discover immediately. He is known for photographing in snow, which he likes due to the lighting associated with it, how it omits non-essential details from the image and the fact that animals manage to live in remote and harsh environments. He is notable for his photographs of arctic wolves on Ellesmere Island in Canada, which he took during six years of expeditions, and became the basis for his photo-book Arctique (2015). His quest to photograph snow leopards began in 2011 and involved six trips to Tibet before he first encountered the animal in 2016. It resulted in two photo-books about Tibet and snow leopards, Tibet : promesse de l'invisible and Tibet : Minéral animal, both published in 2018 and the latter with texts by the writer Sylvain Tesson who joined one of the expeditions. It is the subject of Tesson's book , which also includes photographs by Munier.

Munier received the Eric Hosking Award in 2000, 2001 and 2002. He was the first photographer to receive this award three times.

Selected publications
Bibliography adapted from France Inter.
 Le Ballet des grues, with Alain Salvi, 2000
 L'Ours, with Philippe Huet, 2005
 Blanc nature, with Lysiane Ganousse, 2006
 Clair de brume : Regards sur les Vosges, text by Laurent Joffrion, 2007
 Kamtchatka : La vie sauvage aux confins du monde, text by Anna Konevskaya, 2008
 Au fil des songes, with Michel Munier, text by Charlélie Couture, 2010
 De crépuscules en crépuscules, text by Pierre Pelot, 2011
 Arctique, 2015
 Tibet : promesse de l'invisible, 2018
 Tibet : Minéral animal : sur les traces de la panthère des neiges, text by Sylvain Tesson, 2018

References

External links
 Personal website 

1976 births
Living people
21st-century French photographers
Nature photographers
French documentary film directors
People from Épinal